The green-backed eremomela (Eremomela canescens) is a member of the Cisticolidae. This bird is a common resident breeder in tropical Africa from Kenya and Ethiopia to Cameroon.

This tiny passerine is typically found in open woodland. The green-backed eremomela builds a cup-shaped nest of leaves and silk low in a bush or tree. The normal clutch is two eggs.

References

green-backed eremomela
Birds of Sub-Saharan Africa
green-backed eremomela